Hermann Wallich (December 28, 1833 – April 30, 1928) was a German Jewish banker.

Together with Georg von Siemens, he co-founded Deutsche Bank.

Hermann Wallich was born in Bonn. He married Anna Jacoby in 1875. The couple had a son, Paul Wallich (1882–1938), who also worked as a banker, and a daughter, Ilse. Wallich died in Berlin, aged 94.

19th-century German businesspeople
German bankers
19th-century German Jews
Businesspeople from Bonn
1833 births
1928 deaths